Boxing at the 2016 South Asian Games were held in Guwahati, India from 10 – 15 February 2016.

Medalists

Medal table

Final standing

Men

Women

References

External links
Official website

2016 South Asian Games
Boxing at the South Asian Games
Events at the 2016 South Asian Games
South Asian Games